Joel Murray (born April 17, 1963) is an American comedy actor. He is well known for his roles in the television series Mad Men, Grand, Love & War, Dharma & Greg, Still Standing, and Shameless. He has also appeared in films including God Bless America and  Monsters University.

Early life
Murray was born and raised in Wilmette, Illinois, the son of Lucille (née Collins; 19211988), a mail room clerk, and Edward Joseph Murray II (19211967), a lumber salesman. He grew up in an Irish Catholic family.

One of nine siblings, he is the younger brother of actors Bill Murray, Brian Doyle-Murray, and John Murray. A sister, Nancy, is an Adrian Dominican Sister in Michigan, who toured the U.S. portraying St. Catherine of Siena. His brother Ed died in 2020. Their father died in 1967 at the age of 46 from complications of diabetes.

In high school at Loyola Academy, Murray was captain of the football team and the lead actor in one of the school's musicals. His entertainment career began in Chicago, Illinois, where he performed at various improvisational theaters, including the Improv Olympic, the Improv Institute, and The Second City.

Career
Murray voiced Cheetos mascot Chester Cheetah from the character's inception in 1986 until 1997. He was replaced by Pete Stacker in 1997.

In 1989 Murray performed at Second City (71st Revue) in The Gods Must Be Lazy.

Murray starred in the 1990 television series Grand, the 1991 comedy series Pacific Station, the 1992 comedy series Love & War as Ray Litvak, and the ABC series Dharma & Greg as Pete Cavanaugh. Murray also featured in commercials for First Chicago NBD. He provided his voice for the short-lived 1994 series Beethoven and the TV series 3-South. He played the supporting character "Fitz" on CBS's sitcom Still Standing. He appeared as Eddie Jackson on Showtime's series Shameless in 2011.

Murray's first film role was in the 1986 comedy film One Crazy Summer as George Calamari. His other roles include the 1988 comedy film Scrooged, with his brothers Bill, Brian, and John. He appeared in the 1992 movie Shakes the Clown with One Crazy Summer co-stars Bob Goldthwait and Tom Villard.

In the first, second, fourth, fifth and seventh seasons of the Emmy-winning AMC TV series Mad Men, Murray appeared in 15 episodes as copywriter Freddy Rumsen. He has made guest appearances on television shows such as The Nanny, Joan of Arcadia, Two and a Half Men, Malcolm in the Middle, Criminal Minds, and Blossom.

In the 2012 film God Bless America he portrays Frank, a man whose contempt for superficiality and meanness in American society sends him over the edge and into a killing spree.

In the 2013 Pixar film Monsters University he provides the voice of Don Carlton, a middle-aged monster who is a college student and salesman.

In April 2014, Murray replaced Chip Esten in the improv-comedy troupe Whose Live Anyway? and performs with Whose Line Is It Anyway? cast members Ryan Stiles, Greg Proops and Jeff B. Davis. He also portrayed Ted in the comedy horror film Bloodsucking Bastards.

Personal life
Murray has been married to Eliza Coyle since 1989 and they have four children. He and his brothers own a country club themed restaurant, the Murray Brothers "Caddyshack" (run by his brother Andy), named after the 1980 comedy film that starred his brothers Bill and Brian, located in the World Golf Village resort near St. Augustine, Florida.

Filmography

References

External links

1963 births
Living people
20th-century American male actors
21st-century American male actors
American male film actors
American male television actors
American male voice actors
American people of Irish descent
American television directors
Male actors from Chicago
People from Wilmette, Illinois